is a town located in Wake District, Okayama Prefecture, Japan. , the town had an estimated population of 13,833 in 6353 households and a population density of 96 persons per km². The town is famous in the region for the 'Wamojiyaki' festival that takes place every year on August 15 during the Obon period, and the town is also home to the largest Wisteria park in Japan.

Geography
Wake is located in southeastern  Okayama Prefecture. The Yoshii River and the Kongo River flow through the town, which is largely covered by hills and forests.The center of the town forms a small basin at the point where the Yoshii River and the Kongo River meet.

Adjoining municipalities
Okayama Prefecture
Akaiwa
Mimasaka
Bizen
Misaki

Climate
Wake has a humid subtropical climate (Köppen climate classification Cfa).

Demographics
Per Japanese census data, the population of Wake in 2020 is 13,623 people. Wake has been conducting censuses since 1920.

History 
The Wake area is part of ancient Bizen Province. The important Nara period official Wake no Kiyomaro is from this area. During the Edo Period, it was part of the holdings of Okayama Domain. Following the Meiji restoration, the village of Wake was established within Wake District, Okayama with the creation of the modern municipalities system on April 1, 1889. It was raised to town status on February 6, 1901. On March 1, 2006 Wake was officially merged with the neighboring town of Saeki, also from Wake District. The newly merged town retains the name 'Wake'.

Government
Wake has a mayor-council form of government with a directly elected mayor and a unicameral city council of 12 members. Wake, collectively with the city of Bizen, contributes two members to the Okayama Prefectural Assembly. In terms of national politics, the town is part of the Okayama 1st district of the lower house of the Diet of Japan.

Economy
The economy of Wake is based agriculture and food processing, and the cultivation of fruit trees such as grapes, apples, plums, and cherries.

Education
Wake has three public elementary schools and two public junior high schools operated by the city government, and one public high school operated by the Okayama prefectural Board of Education.

Transportation

Railway 
 JR West (JR West) - San'yō Main Line

Highways 
  San'yō Expressway

Sister city relations
 - Jiading District, Shanghai, China, since July 31, 1989
 -  Hanna, Alberta, Canada., since March 31, 1993

References

External links

Wake official website 

Towns in Okayama Prefecture